There are several rivers named Arapari River.

Brazil
 Arapari River (Amapá)
 Arapari River (Roraima), a river of Roraima

See also
 Amapari River, a river of Amapá, Brazil